Pax Sinica (Latin for "Chinese peace") is a historiographical term referring to periods of peace and stability in East Asia, Northeast Asia, Southeast Asia, and Central Asia led by China. A study on the Sinocentric world system reveals that the multiple periods of Pax Sinica, when taken together, amounted to a length of approximately two thousand years.

The first Pax Sinica of the Eastern world emerged during the rule of the Han dynasty and coincided with the Pax Romana of the Western world led by the Roman Empire. It stimulated long-distance travel and trade in Eurasian history. Both the first Pax Sinica and the Pax Romana eroded at circa AD 200.

A resurgence of this term has happened in recent years, especially after 2010. The rapid rise of the People's Republic of China is seen by some analysts as a possible return to Pax Sinica, as the economy of China is set to be the largest national economy in the world, and already has in some aspects.

Periods of historical Pax Sinica

Han dynasty 
The first period of Pax Sinica came into being during the Han dynasty of China. Domestically, the power of the emperor was consolidated following the devastation of the feudal system. The Rule of Wen and Jing (文景之治) and the Rule of Ming and Zhang (明章之治) were periods of societal stability and economic prosperity. Externally, the Han dynasty neutralized the threat posed by the nomadic Xiongnu following a series of wars. The boundaries of China were extended into what is modern-day western Xinjiang, South Korea (near modern Seoul), and Vietnam (around modern Huế). The Silk Road emerged as a major route that connected the East and the West after the Han diplomat Zhang Qian established contact with the numerous Central Asian tribes and states, thus facilitating commerce and cultural exchanges.

The Pax Sinica established by the Han dynasty is often compared to the Pax Romana of the Roman Empire. The Pax Sinica of the Han dynasty ended following decades of internal turmoil that later led to the downfall of the Han dynasty and a period of fragmentation in Chinese history.

Tang dynasty 
The Tang dynasty was one of the golden ages in Chinese history and presided over another period of Pax Sinica. The Tang capital, Chang'an, was a major economic and cultural hub, and was the world's largest urban settlement at the time. The Silk Road facilitated economic and cultural exchanges between China and the outside world, with Persians and Sogdians among those who benefited the most from such exchanges with China. In the north, the First Turkic Khaganate was defeated and annexed; in the west, the Tang dynasty extended its control as far as modern-day Afghanistan and the Aral Sea; in the east, Tang control reached Sakhalin. During its peak, the Tang dynasty maintained hegemony over 72 tributary states. During this period, Chinese culture was revitalized and became more diverse and cosmopolitan. The amount of interaction between China and Japan increased; Chinese influence on Japanese culture and politics became more prominent since the Tang dynasty.

Yuan dynasty 

The Yuan dynasty was an imperial dynasty of China ruled by ethnic Mongol and was the main successor to the Mongol Empire. While the Yuan dynasty is often considered a legitimate Chinese dynasty that bore the Mandate of Heaven, historians usually classify this period of peace under the Pax Mongolica.

Ming dynasty 
The Ming dynasty of China presided over another period of Pax Sinica. This period saw the formal institutionalization of the Chinese tributary system, illustrating the great political power of China at the time. The seven maritime expeditions led by Zheng He projected the imperial power of the Ming dynasty across Southeast Asia, South Asia, the Middle East, and East Africa. During this period, China also exerted a great amount of influence on the culture and politics of Korea.

Qing dynasty 
The Qing dynasty of China heralded another period of Pax Sinica. At its peak, it ruled over the fourth largest empire territorially, constituting 9.87 per cent of the world's total land area. The High Qing era was a period of sustained peace, economic prosperity and territorial expansion. The multicultural and multiethnic nature of the Qing dynasty was fundamental to the subsequent formation of the modern nationalist concept of Zhonghua minzu. As the rulers of the Qing dynasty were ethnic Manchu, this period of peace is also sometimes known as "Pax Manjurica".

Possible return and obstacles 

A resurgence of the term has been observed in recent years, especially after 2010, as China has not been involved in any significant military conflict since the Sino-Vietnamese War in 1979. The rapid rise of the People's Republic of China is seen by some analysts as a possible return to Pax Sinica, as the economy of China continues to expand into the largest national economy in the world.  A forecast by the British-based Centre for Economics and Business Research has stated that China is set to overtake the United States as the world's biggest economy by 2028, half a decade sooner than expected.

China's economic development is tied to its large, working population and continuous, rapid industrialization, so much so that China has overtaken most Western nations in exports of finished goods and technological products. However, the aging of China's population could create challenging social issues, increase the risk of social instability, and limit its capabilities to act as a new global hegemon.

See also 

 List of periods of regional peace
 Pax Romana; Sino-Roman relations; Comparative studies of the Roman and Han empires
 Silk Road & Maritime Silk Road; Belt and Road Initiative
 Golden ages of China; Chinese Century
 Constitution of the People's Republic of China
 Five Principles of Peaceful Coexistence
 Community of Common Destiny
 Tianxia Datong ("Great Unity All Under Heaven")
 Heaven worship / Mandate of Heaven: Son of Heaven & Khan of Heaven
 Celestial Empire; Sinocentrism; Tributary system of China
 Civilization state; Chinese culture; East Asian cultural sphere
 China and the United Nations; Military operations other than war (China); Chinese foreign aid

References

Further reading 

 KIM, S.S, China's Pacific Policy: Reconciling the Irreconcilable, International Journal, 1994.
 Kueh, Y.Y. (2012). Pax Sinica: Geopolitics and Economics of China's Ascendance
 TERMINSKI, Bogumil, (2010), The Evolution of the Concept of Perpetual Peace in the History of Political-Legal Thought, Perspectivas Internacionales, vol. 10: 277–291.
 YEOH, Kok Kheng, (2009), Towards Pax Sinica?: China's rise and transformation : impacts and implications, University of Malaya.
 ZHANG, Yongjin, (2001), System, empire and state in Chinese international relations, Review of International Studies, vol. 27: 43–63.

Historiography of China
Foreign relations of China
6th century BC in international relations
Pax Sinica
International relations
Pax